The territory currently known as the United Arab Emirates was home to three distinct Iron Age periods. Iron Age I spanned 1,200–1,000 BCE, Iron Age II from 1,000–600 BCE, and Iron Age III from 600–300 BCE. This period of human development in the region was followed by the Mleiha or Late Pre-Islamic era, from 300 BCE onwards through to the Islamic era which commenced with the culmination of the 7th century Ridda Wars.

To some degree the term 'Iron Age' is misapplied, as little evidence exists for any indigenous iron-work outside the finds at Muweilah, themselves thought to be imports, and even the extensive evidence of smelting throughout the Iron Age found at Saruq Al Hadid is dominated by copper and tin production.

Finds from the important site of Tell Abraq have been crucial in the division of the three Iron Age periods in the UAE.

Iron Age I 

The Iron Age I period in the UAE immediately followed the Wadi Suq period, which ran from 2,000-1,300 BCE. The Wadi Suq people not only domesticated camels, but there is evidence they also planted crops of wheat, barley and dates. A gradual shift away from coastal to inland settlements took place through the period. The majority of finds dated to the Iron Age I period are centered around Shimal, Tell Abraq and Al Hamriyah on the West coast and Kalba to the East. Despite growing inland development, the Iron Age I diet still contained a large amount of fish and shellfish. Gazelle, oryx and domesticated animals (sheep, goats and cattle) also formed part of the Iron Age I diet, supplemented by the emerging widespread cultivation of wheat and barley.

Iron Age I ceramics reflect a continuity from the Wadi Suq period and are coarse, often large in scale. Another link to the Wadi Suq period was revealed when analysis of a bivalve shell dated to the Iron Age I period showed it had contained atacamite, a copper-based pigment used as eye make-up. Similar shells were found in a Wadi Suq burial in Sha'am, in Northern Ras Al Khaimah.

Iron Age II 

Extensive evidence of Iron Age II settlement has been found throughout the UAE, particularly at Muweilah, Thuqeibah, Bidaa bint Saud, as well as Rumailah and Qattara in Al Ain. The development of increasingly complex irrigation ditches and waterways, falaj (plural aflaj) took place during this time and finds at Bidaa bint Saud and Thuqeibah date back to the Iron Age II period – pre-dating finds of qanat waterways in Iran. Early finds of aflaj, particularly those around the desert city of Al Ain, have been cited as the earliest evidence of the construction of these waterways. It is thought nearby Bidaa bint Saud became an important site during the Iron Age, both as a caravan stop and as a settled community of farmers that used the falaj irrigation system there. Two of these irrigation passages have been partly excavated at Bidaa bint Saud, with a number of sections remaining in reasonable condition. In one of the excavations, a number of sandstone-lined shaft holes were discovered, as well as a stepped underground access point and a large open cistern. Evidence of formerly irrigated land has also been found at the site.

Rumailah, today part of Al Ain, was a major Iron Age II settlement dated from around 1,100–500 BCE. Finds at Rumailah include distinctive pottery adorned with snake patterns, similar to finds at Qusais, Masafi and the major Iron and Bronze Ages; metallurgical production centre at Saruq Al Hadid, as well as chlorite vessels decorated with turtles alternating with trees, similar to finds from Qidfa' in Fujairah, Qusais in Dubai and Al-Hajar in Bahrain.

A number of Iron Age swords and axe-heads, as well as distinctive seal moulds, were also recovered from the site. A number of bronze arrowheads were also found at the site. The Iron Age buildings found at Rumailah are typical of those found in the region, at Iron Age I and II sites such as Al Thuqeibah and Muweilah, with a number of row dwellings, although lacking the perimeter walls found at Thuqeibah. A columned hall at Rumailah provides a further link to Muweilah, while a number of pyramidal seals found there echo with similar objects discovered at Bidaa bint Saud.

Radiocarbon dating artefacts found at Muweilah puts the settlement's original date of establishment at between 850 and 800 BC and it enjoyed a brief heyday before being destroyed in a fire around 600 BC. Constructed in the main from interlocked mud bricks and mud/stone brick walls, the walled settlement itself surrounds a large walled enclosure with seven buildings, thought to have provided living quarters as well as an administrative centre. This central building contained at least twenty columns and has been a rich trove for archaeologists, with extensive finds of painted and spouted vessels, iron weapons and hundreds of bronze pieces. Enabled by the domestication of the camel in the region, thought to have taken place around 1,000 BC, Muweilah's trade included the manufacture of copper goods, with "extensive casting spillage from the manufacture of copper items found throughout the site". Muweilah is relatively unique in its early and extensive adoption of iron goods, thought to have been imported from Iran. Hundreds of grinding stones indicate the consumption of both barley and wheat. Although now some 15 km inland today, it is thought that in its heyday, Muweilah would have been located on a khor or creek.

The Iron Age II period also saw the construction of fortifications, with a number of towers and other buildings offering protection to aflaj and the crops they watered. Hili 14 in Al Ain, Madhab Fort and Awhala Fort in Fujairah as well as Jebel Buhais near Madam in Sharjah and Rafaq in the Wadi Qor in Ras Al Khaimah are all fortifications dating to this time.

Iron age aflaj 
Recent finds of pottery in Thuqeibah and Madam have further linked the development of early aflaj (plural for falaj, the word used to denote waterways of this type in the United Arab Emirates) water systems there to an Iron Age II date, further substantiating the attribution of the innovation of these water systems to a southeastern Arabian origin based on the extensive archaeological work of Dr Wasim Takriti around the area of Al Ain.

The 2002 publication of a paper by Tikriti, The south-east Arabian origin of the falaj system, provided the first counterpoint to the long-accepted narrative, that the Qanat originated in Persia and was identified as such by accounts of the campaigns of the Assyrian King, Sargon II, in 714 BCE. Tikriti cites this and also accounts by the Greek second and third century historian Polybius as being the basis for academic attribution of the technology to Persia. He notes academics such as JC Wilkinson (1977) adopting an Iranian origin for the technology under the influence of Sargon's annals and Polybius, but points out at least seven Iron Age aflaj recently discovered in the Al Ain area of the UAE have been reliably carbon dated back to the beginning of the first millennium BCE. Additional to finds of Iron Age aflaj in Al Ain, Tikrit pointed to excavations in Al Madam, Sharjah, by the French archaeological team working there, as well as by a German team working in Maysar, in Oman. Tikriti is at pains to point out that, despite long-standing efforts since the 19th century to excavate qanat systems in Iran, no evidence has been found for any such qanat there dated earlier than the 5th century BCE. He concludes that the technology originated in South East Arabia and was likely taken to Persia, likely by the Sasanian conquest of the Oman peninsular.

Others have followed Tikriti's lead. In 2016, Rémy Boucharlat in his paper Qanāt and Falaj: Polycentric and Multi-Period Innovations Iran and the United Arab Emirates as Case Studies, asserted that the attribution of the technology to Iranians in the early first millennium BCE is a position that cannot longer be maintained, and that the carbon dating of aflaj in Oman and the UAE to the ninth century BCE by Cleuziou and evidence for such an early date provided by Tikriti are definitive. Additionally, Boucharlat maintains that no known Iranian qanat can be dated to the pre-Islamic period.

Iron Age III 

Evidence of Iron Age III occupation in the Emirates can be found at Tell Abraq, Shimal, Rumailah, Hili and Thuqeibah. Finds draw a strong cultural link with the Archaemenid Iranians and point to the area being the satrapy of Maka. Iron Age short swords from Qusais, Jebel Buhais and Rumailah mirror images of 'natives of Maka' found on the throne of Darius II at Persepolis, while ceramics found dating back to the Iron Age III period mirror those found in a number of Iranian sites of the era.

Post Iron Age 
The period from 300–0 BCE has been dubbed both the Mleiha and the Late Pre-Islamic period, and follows on from the dissolution of Darius III's empire. Although the era has been called Hellenistic, Alexander the Great's conquests went no further than Persia and he left Arabia untouched. However, Macedonian coinage unearthed at Ed-Dur dates back to Alexander the Great. Contemporary Greek manuscripts have given the exports from Ed-Dur as 'pearls, purple dye, clothing, wine, gold and slaves, and a great quantity of dates'.

The most complete evidence of human settlement and community from this time is at Mleiha, where a thriving agrarian community benefited from the protection of a mudbrick fort. It was here, and during this period, that the most complete evidence of iron usage has been found, including nails, long swords and arrowheads as well as evidence of slag from smelting.

See also 
 Archaeology of the United Arab Emirates
History of the United Arab Emirates
 List of Ancient Settlements in the UAE

References 

History of the United Arab Emirates
History of the United Arab Emirates by topic
History of the United Arab Emirates by period
Iron Age Asia